Flight 592 can refer to:

Lufthansa Flight 592, aircraft hijacking in 1993
ValuJet Flight 592, in-flight fire resulting in a crash in 1996

0592